Argem Shipyard (Turkish: Argem Tersanesi) is a Turkish shipyard established in Tuzla, Istanbul, in 1999.

See also 

 List of shipbuilders and shipyards

References

External links 

 Argem Shipyard

Turkish companies established in 1999
Shipyards of Turkey
Shipbuilding companies of Turkey